The Charles J. Martin House is a house in the Lowry Hill neighborhood of Minneapolis, Minnesota, United States.  The 1903 Renaissance Revival mansion and its grounds are a well-preserved example of an early-20th-century urban estate.  The property was listed on the National Register of Historic Places in 1978 for having local significance in architecture.

The house was built for Charles J. Martin.  He served for many years as the secretary and treasurer of the Washburn-Crosby Company, a predecessor of General Mills.  Martin also promoted civic causes such as city parks, libraries, and art societies.

The house was designed by prominent Minneapolis architect William Channing Whitney in the Renaissance Revival style, which was popular for large urban residences at the beginning of the 20th century.  The house has been well preserved and well maintained.

See also
 National Register of Historic Places listings in Hennepin County, Minnesota

References

Houses completed in 1903
Houses in Minneapolis
Houses on the National Register of Historic Places in Minnesota
National Register of Historic Places in Minneapolis
Renaissance Revival architecture in Minnesota